Iván Martínez Puyol (born 1 March 1983) is a Spanish retired footballer who played as a central midfielder, and the current manager of Deportivo Aragón.

Playing career
Born in Zaragoza, Aragon, Martínez finished his formation with hometown side Real Zaragoza, and started to feature for the reserves during the 2001–02 season, in Segunda División B. He would be regularly used in the farm team the following campaign, but failed to make the breakthrough into the first team.

After two years with UD Casetas (suffering relegation from the third division in his first), Martínez moved to CA Osasuna B, also in division three. He continued to appear in both third and fourth tiers for the remainder of his career, representing UD Barbastro, Villajoyosa CF (two stints), CD La Muela, CD Sariñena (where he acted as team captain) and CD Teruel.

In 2015, aged 32, Martínez announced his retirement.

Coaching career
In October 2013, while still a player, Martínez was named interim manager of Sariñena. His tenure lasted one match, a 0–0 home draw against Getafe CF B, and he subsequently returned to his playing role after the appointment of Manolo Villanova.

In 2015, shortly after retiring, Martínez returned to his first club Zaragoza, being appointed in charge of the Infantil B squad. He later worked with the Cadete B and Juvenil A squad, managing the latter side in the 2019–20 UEFA Youth League.

On 22 July 2020, Martínez was appointed manager of Zaragoza's B-team in the fourth division. On 9 November, he took over the main squad in the place of sacked Rubén Baraja; initially an interim, he was announced as manager by director of football Lalo Arantegui two days later.

Martínez's first professional match in charge of the Blanquillos occurred on 13 November 2020, a 1–2 home loss against Real Oviedo. On 13 December, he returned to the reserves after the appointment of Juan Ignacio Martínez in the main squad.

Managerial statistics

References

External links
 
 
 

1983 births
Living people
Spanish footballers
Footballers from Zaragoza
Association football midfielders
Segunda División B players
Tercera División players
Real Zaragoza B players
CD Universidad de Zaragoza players
CA Osasuna B players
UD Barbastro players
Villajoyosa CF footballers
CD La Muela players
CD Sariñena players
CD Teruel footballers
Spanish football managers
Segunda División managers
Segunda División B managers
Tercera División managers
Real Zaragoza managers